The 2021 Northeast Conference Football Championship Game was a college football game played on Sunday, April 11, 2021, to determine the 2020–21 champion of the Northeast Conference. The game featured the Sacred Heart Pioneers and the Duquesne Dukes in the conference's first championship game.

Sacred Heart Pioneers 

Sacred Heart entered the game with a 3-1 record. Sacred Heart had been the Northeastern Conference champions 4 times prior in 2001, 2013, 2014, and 2018.

Duquesne Dukes 

Duquesne entered the game with a 4-0 record, claiming home field advantage in the game by virtue of their better record.  Sacred Heart had been the Northeastern Conference champions 5 times prior in 2011, 2013, 2015, 2016, and 2018.

Game summary

References

Championship Game
Duquesne Dukes football games
Sacred Heart Pioneers football games
Northeast Conference Football Championship Game
Northeast Conference Football Championship Game